Jugendstilsenteret is an Art Nouveau Center located in central Ålesund, in Møre og Romsdal, Norway.

Jugendstilsenteret is part of the Foundation Cultural Quarter in Ålesund. The Art Nouveau Center is located in the former Art Nouveau designed building of Swan Pharmacy (Svaneapoteket i Ålesund). The building itself was designed by Norwegian architect Hagbarth Martin Schytte-Berg (1860-1944) and built between 1905 and 1907. It was the first listed Art Nouveau / Jugendstil monument in Ålesund (1984) and it includes the town's best preserved Art Nouveau interior. Jugendstilsenteret is an interpretive center exhibiting both modern multimedia exhibitions and international art. The Art Nouveau center was opened by Queen Sonja of Norway on June 6, 2003. The center was selected as the millennium site for Møre og Romsdal county.

See also
Jugendstil

References

External links
 Jugendstilsenteret - The Art Nouveaus Centre
 A European network of Art Nouveau cities
 Pictures of the former Swam Pharmacy
 

2003 establishments in Norway
Art museums established in 2003
Museums in Møre og Romsdal
Architecture museums
Art Nouveau architecture in Norway
Art museums and galleries in Norway
Buildings and structures in Ålesund
Commercial buildings completed in 1907
Art Nouveau collections
Art Nouveau retail buildings
Art Nouveau museum buildings
Millennium sites